The Star Ferry is a passenger ferry service operator and tourist attraction in Hong Kong. Its principal routes carry passengers across Victoria Harbour, between Hong Kong Island, and Kowloon. The service is operated by the Star Ferry Company, which was founded in 1888 as the Kowloon Ferry Company, and adopted its present name in 1898.

With a fleet of twelve ferries, the company operates two routes across the harbour, carrying over 70,000 passengers per day, or 26 million per year. Even though the harbour is crossed by railway and road tunnels, the Star Ferry continues to provide a scenic yet inexpensive mode of harbour crossing. The company's main route runs between Central and Tsim Sha Tsui.

It was rated first in the "Top 10 Most Exciting Ferry Rides" poll by SATW (Society of American Travel Writers) in February 2009.

History
Before the steam ferry service was first established, people would cross the harbour in sampans. In 1870, a man named Grant Smith brought a twin-screw wooden-hulled boat from England and started running it across the harbour at irregular intervals.

In July 1873, an attempt was made to run steam ferries between Hong Kong and Kowloon. This was stopped at the request of the British consul in Canton, who feared it would enable visits to gambling houses in Kowloon. It is thought that a service to the public was established in the mid-to-late 1870s, after the cession of Kowloon to the British in 1860.

The company was founded by Parsee merchant Dorabjee Naorojee Mithaiwala as the "Kowloon Ferry Company" in 1888. Naorojee bought Smith's boat, and later acquired the steam vessels Morning Star and Evening Star from a Mr Buxoo. The popularity of this means of transport enabled him to increase his fleet to four vessels within 10 years: the Morning Star, Evening Star, Rising Star and Guiding Star. Each boat had a capacity of 100 passengers, and the boats averaged 147 crossings each day. He incorporated the business into the "Star Ferry Co Ltd" in 1898, prior to his retirement to India. The company name was inspired by his love of Alfred Lord Tennyson's poem "Crossing the Bar", of which the first line reads "Sunset and evening star, and one clear call for me!".

At the time regular service was initiated, ships were moored by having a sailor on the vessel toss the rope to another on the pier, who would then catch it with a long billhook. This is still done today.

On his retirement in 1898, Naorojee sold the company to The Hongkong and Kowloon Wharf and Godown Company Limited, at that time owned by Jardine, Matheson & Co. and Sir Paul Chater.

A pier constructed on the western end of Salisbury Road opened in 1906, it was a fine massive structure at that time and it also had a separate compartment for the first and second class. However, it was destroyed by a typhoon in September 1906.

In the early 1950s, construction of the present twin-piered terminal commenced on both sides of Victoria Harbour, designed to handle 55 million passenger trips a year. The structure was completed in 1957, concurrent with the Edinburgh Place Ferry Pier built on the island side.

At the turn of the century, Hong Kong currency and Canton currency were both accepted as legal tender in Hong Kong. In the autumn of 1912, following a devaluation, the Star Ferry caused a controversy by insisting, together with the tramways, that payment had to be made in Hong Kong currency only. Canton coinage would no longer be accepted.<ref name=floats>Richard Frost, History floats aboard Star ferries , The Standard, 1 May 1998</ref>

In 1924, the Yaumati Ferry operated the route to Kowloon in a duopoly. In 1933, the Star Ferry made history by building the Electric Star, the first diesel electric passenger ferry of its kind.

By 1941, the company had six vessels. During the Japanese occupation of Hong Kong, the competing Yaumati Ferry was allowed to continue, while the Japanese commandeered the Star Ferry for their own purposes. The Golden Star and the Meridian Star were used to transport prisoners of war from Sham Shui Po to Kai Tak Airport. In 1943, the Golden Star was bombed and sunk in the Canton River by the Americans, and the Electric Star was sunk in the harbour. After the war, the ferries were recovered and returned to service.

The Star Ferry accepted the request by the government of operating the Hung Hom route in 1963. It almost failed to operate as the company thought it could not make profit from it. But with the reconsideration by the Star Ferry, the route was confirmed to be operating starting from March 1965.

Until the opening of the Cross-Harbour Tunnel in 1972, the Star Ferry remained the main means of public transportation between Hong Kong Island and the Kowloon side.

The Star Ferry operates on a franchise from the Government, which was last renewed in March 2018.

Public protests

In 1966, a fare increase of 5 cents (or 25%) of the ferry was a political milestone, as it caused a 27-year-old student to go on hunger strike in protest at the Edinburgh Place terminal. His arrest sparked the 1966 Hong Kong Riots.

On 11 November 2006, the end of an era was marked when the third generation pier in Central, the Edinburgh Place Ferry Pier, ended its mission, along with the big clock tower. The pier was destroyed to make way for reclamation, amidst great controversy and peaceful but reasonable protests.

Services
Existing

The Star Ferry operates the following cross-harbour routes (The fares (in HK$ below) are effective from 9 February 2021):
Central to Tsim Sha Tsui. For lower deck, it costs $2.60 on Mondays to Fridays; $3.60 on Saturdays, Sundays and public holidays. For upper deck, $3.20 on Mondays to Fridays; $4.20 on Saturdays, Sundays and public holidays.
Wan Chai to Tsim Sha Tsui for $3.20 on Mondays to Fridays; $4.20 on Saturdays, Sundays and public holidays.
Harbour Tour: a tourist cruise, making an indirect, circular route to all the stops, namely Tsim Sha Tsui, Central and Wan Chai.
Passengers may use Octopus or tokens (Jeton) to pay for the ride. Tokens are available in the vending machines at the piers. Direct payment by coins at turnstile is no longer accepted.

The Tsim Sha Tsui – Central route does not accept cycles, but the Tsim Sha Tsui – Wan Chai route accepts cycles for an extra charge of $14, except during the evening peak hour from Wan Chai to Tsim Sha Tsui.

Tsim Sha Tsui to Hong Kong Disneyland.
Star Ferry has announced plans to provide sightseeing service between Tsim Sha Tsui and Disneyland Resort Pier, which has been empty since its opening. This route consists of two departures and the round trip fare is $180. Passengers can enjoy views of Tsing Ma Bridge during the 45-minute journey on the luxury ferry World Star.

Former
Central to Hung Hom for $6.30, terminated effective 1 April 2011.
Wan Chai to Hung Hom for $6.30, terminated effective 1 April 2011.

Charter and hire
The Star Ferry "Golden Star' is available for daily charter, for up to 300 people, having been refurbished for cruises and functions, with tables, larger sightseeing windows, an air-conditioned area, and a public address and music system.

Fleet
There are currently 9 diesel-electric ferries in the fleet, together with a tug.

Over the years, the fleet has included:

Piers

 Star Ferry Pier, Central at Central District
 First Generation (1890) Pedder Street and Chater Road
 Second Generation (1912) at Pedder Street, the present site of Jardine House
 Third Generation (1957) near Edinburgh Place
 Fourth Generation (2006) at Man Kwong Street
 Piers 7 and 8 of Central Ferry Piers until 2011. Pier 7 served Tsim Sha Tsui, while Pier 8 served Hung Hom
 Piers 7 of Central Ferry Piers since 2011. Pier 8 was converted into a museum in 2013.
 Star Ferry Pier at Tsim Sha Tsui (1957)
 Wan Chai Pier
 Second Generation (1968), closed effective 29 August 2014.
 Third Generation (2014), in service since 30 August 2014.
 Hung Hom Ferry Pier, service terminated effective 1 April 2011.

Financial problems
Since the Central Star Ferry Pier was moved from its old pier next to City Hall to the new location outside International Finance Centre, passenger numbers have fallen drastically to mainly tourists and a small number of commuters. This has meant the Star Ferry company has lost many millions of dollars since the relocation. Therefore, it decided not to re-tender for the loss-making Hung Hom-Central and Hung Hom-Wan Chai routes and stopped operating these routes and the relevant piers at Hung Hom Ferry Pier on 31 March 2011."Cancellation of Ferry Services between Hunghom and Central/Wanchai"  Star Ferry Co. 15 March 2011. Retrieved 30 March 2011

 Filmography 
The Star Ferry appears in the 1960 film The World of Suzie Wong. In the beginning of the film, Robert Lomax (played by William Holden) disembarks from the SS President Wilson (an old American President Lines transpacific passenger vessel) and takes the Star Ferry to Hong Kong Island, and on the ferry meets Suzie Wong (played by Nancy Kwan), who scorns his attentions.

Several brief scenes in the 1988 TV miniseries Noble House are set aboard the ferry. It also appears in the French films Les Anges gardiens (1995) and La Moustache (2005).

See also
Hong Kong & Kowloon Ferry
List of places in Hong Kong
Transport in Hong Kong

References

Further reading
 Hong Kong: Epilogue to an Empire'', Jan Morris

External links

 Official website

 
Transport companies established in 1888
1888 establishments in Hong Kong